Bath Presbyterian Church and Cemetery is a historic church in Blythe, Georgia.

It was built in 1814 and was added to the National Register of Historic Places in 2004.

It has a Greek Revival Sunday School wing.

References

Presbyterian churches in Georgia (U.S. state)
Churches on the National Register of Historic Places in Georgia (U.S. state)
Churches completed in 1814
Protestant Reformed cemeteries
Buildings and structures in Richmond County, Georgia
National Register of Historic Places in Richmond County, Georgia
Greek Revival architecture in Georgia (U.S. state)